The Royal Australian Army Service Corps (RAASC) was a corps within the Australian Army. Formed on 1 July 1903, in the aftermath of the Federation of Australia, it was initially known as the Australian Army Service Corps (AASC) and subsumed the functions that had been undertaken by various organisations within the colonial forces. In 1948, the Royal prefix was bestowed upon the corps. The corps served in World War I, World War II, as part of the British Commonwealth Occupation Force in Japan, Korean War, Malayan Emergency and the Vietnam War. The RAASC was disbanded on 31 May 1973.

After the disbanding of the corps, responsibilities for transport, air dispatch and postal functions were assigned to the newly formed Royal Australian Corps of Transport (RACT) and responsibilities for foodstuffs and petroleum, oil and lubricants (POL) were assigned to the Royal Australian Army Ordnance Corps (RAAOC).

References

Bibliography

External links
Royal Australian Army Service Corp Vietnam Veteran's Association
Patches of the Army Service Corps
Digger History

Service
Ordnance (stores) units and formations
Military units and formations established in 1903
Australian army units with royal patronage